James Gisborne (died 1778) was a British Army officer and Member of the Irish Parliament.

Biography
He was the son of James Gisborne, rector of Staveley, Derbyshire; Thomas Gisborne was his younger brother. He went to Ireland as page to the Duke of Devonshire, and had a successful career in the viceregal household. On 1 June 1739 he joined the Army with a commission as second lieutenant in Bissett's Regiment of Foot, and after a progressive service in the subordinate commissions, he was appointed lieutenant-colonel of the 10th Regiment in 1755, and was afterwards employed many years on the staff of Ireland, as quartermaster-general in that country. 

In 1762 Gisborne was promoted to the rank of colonel of Foot, with command of the 121st Regiment, and on 4 March 1766 he was removed to the 16th Regiment. In 1770 Gisborne was persuaded by Lord Townshend to resign his post as quartermaster-general in favour of Simon Fraser, and was compensated with the sinecure of Governor of Kinsale. However, the government of Kinsale was then required for the outgoing adjutant-general, Robert Cuninghame, and Gisborne was granted a pension of £500 per annum until another government of greater value should become vacant; he was later appointed Governor of Charlemont. Gisborne was promoted to major-general in 1770, and to lieutenant-general in 1777. 

Besides his military career, Gisborne was Gentleman Usher of the Black Rod from September 1757, and sat in the Irish House of Commons for Tallow from 1763 to 1768, and for Lismore from 1768 until his death on 20 February 1778.

References

1720s births
1778 deaths
Irish MPs 1761–1768
Irish MPs 1769–1776
Irish MPs 1776–1783
British Army lieutenant generals
Royal Lincolnshire Regiment officers
Bedfordshire and Hertfordshire Regiment officers
30th Regiment of Foot officers
Members of the Parliament of Ireland (pre-1801) for County Waterford constituencies
Politicians from County Waterford